Parker M. Morin (born July 2, 1991) is an American professional baseball catcher and bullpen catcher for the Kansas City Royals of Major League Baseball.

Morin grew up in the Dallas–Fort Worth metroplex, before his family moved to Utah when he was in the seventh grade. He graduated from Park City High School in Park City, Utah. He enrolled at the College of Southern Idaho, where he played college baseball for the Southern Idaho Golden Eagles. After two seasons, Morin transferred to the University of Utah to continue his college baseball career with the Utah Utes.

The Kansas City Royals selected Morin in the 14th round of the 2012 MLB draft. He played in their minor league system, and played for the United States national baseball team in the 2015 WBSC Premier12. In 2019, he played for the Lancaster Barnstormers of the Atlantic League of Professional Baseball.

References

External links

Living people
1991 births
Baseball catchers
Baseball players from Richmond, Virginia
People from Park City, Utah
Baseball players from Utah
Southern Idaho Golden Eagles baseball players
Utah Utes baseball players
2015 WBSC Premier12 players
Major League Baseball bullpen catchers
Idaho Falls Chukars players
Wilmington Blue Rocks players
Northwest Arkansas Naturals players
Omaha Storm Chasers players
Lancaster Barnstormers players
United States national baseball team players